Hanja (Hanja:), alternatively known as Hancha, are Chinese characters used in the writing of Korean. Hanja was used as early as the Gojoseon period, the first ever Korean kingdom.

 refers to Sino-Korean vocabulary, which can be written with Hanja, and  refers to Classical Chinese writing, although Hanja is also sometimes used to encompass both concepts. Because Hanja characters never underwent any major reforms, they more closely resemble kyūjitai and traditional Chinese characters, although the stroke orders for certain characters are slightly different. Only a small number of Hanja characters were modified or are unique to Korean, with the rest being identical to the traditional Chinese characters. By contrast, many of the Chinese characters currently in use in mainland China, Malaysia and Singapore have been simplified, and contain fewer strokes than the corresponding Hanja characters. In Japan, simplified forms of Chinese characters known as shinjitai were also enacted, but are not as extensive. During the 1970s, Singapore had also briefly enacted its own simplification campaign, but eventually adopted the standard simplification of mainland China to avoid confusion.

Although a phonetic Hangul (also known as Chosŏn'gŭl in North Korea) had been created by Sejong the Great in 1446 through the promulgation of the Hunminjeongeum, it did not come into widespread official use until the late 19th and early 20th century. Thus, until that time it was necessary to be fluent in reading and writing Hanja to be literate in Korean, as Korean documents, history, literature and records throughout its history until the contemporary period were written primarily in Literary Chinese using Hanja as its primary script. Therefore, a good working knowledge of Chinese characters is still important for anyone who wishes to interpret and study older texts from Korea, or anyone who wishes to read scholarly texts in the humanities. A high proficiency in Hanja is also useful for understanding the etymology of Sino-Korean words as well as to enlarge one's Korean vocabulary. 

Hanja were once used to write native Korean words, in a variety of systems collectively known as idu, but by the 20th century Koreans used hanja only for writing Sino-Korean words, while writing native vocabulary and loanwords from other languages in Hangul. By the 21st century, even Sino-Korean words are written in the Hangul alphabet most of the time, with the corresponding Chinese character sometimes written next to it to prevent confusion if there are other characters or words with the same Hangul spelling. According to the Standard Korean Language Dictionary published by the National Institute of Korean Language (NIKL), approximately half (50%) of Korean words are Sino-Korean, mostly in academic fields (science, government, and society). Other dictionaries, such as the Urimal Keun Sajeon, claim this number might be as low as roughly 30%.

History

Hanja: Hanmun

There is no traditionally accepted date for when literary Chinese written in Chinese characters entered Korea. Early Chinese dynastic histories, the only sources for very early Korea, do not mention a Korean writing system. During the 3rd century BC, Chinese migrations into the peninsula occurred due to war in northern China and the earliest archaeological evidence of Chinese writing are dated to this period. A large number of inscribed knife money from pre--Lelang sites along the Yalu River have been found. A sword dated to 222 BC with Chinese engraving was unearthed in Pyongyang. 

From 108 BC to 313 AD, the Han dynasty established the Four Commanderies of Han in northern Korea and institutionalized the Chinese language. According to the Samguk Sagi, Goguryeo had  from the beginning of its existence, which starts in 37 BC. It also says that the king of Goguryeo composed a poem in 17 BC. The Gwanggaeto Stele, dated to 414, is the earliest securely dated relic bearing  inscriptions.  became commonplace in Goguryeo during the 5th and 6th centuries and according to the Book of Zhou, the Chinese classics were available in Goguryeo by the end of the 6th century. The Samguk Sagi mentions written records in Baekje beginning in 375 and Goguryeo annals prior to 600. According to the Book of Liang, the people of Silla did not have writing in the first half of the 6th century but this may have been only referring to agreements and contracts, represented by notches on wood. The Bei Shi, covering the period 386-618, says that the writing, armour, and weapons in Silla were the same as those in China. The Samguk Sagi says that records were kept in Silla starting in 545. 

Some western writers claimed that knowledge of Chinese entered Korea with the spread of Buddhism, which occurred around the 4th century. Traditionally Buddhism is believed to have been introduced to Goguryeo in 372, Baekje in 384, and Silla in 527.

Special schools were set up for the well-to-do and the nobility across Korea to train new scholar officials for civil service. Adopted by Silla and Goryeo, the  system was maintained by Goryeo after the unification of Korea until the end of the nineteenth century. The scholarly élite began learning the hanja by memorising the Thousand Character Classic, Three Character Classic and Hundred Family Surnames. Passage of the  required the thorough ability to read, interpret and compose passages of works such as the Analects ((), Great Learning, Doctrine of the Mean, Mencius, Classic of Poetry, Book of Documents, Classic of Changes, Spring and Autumn Annals and Book of Rites. Other important works include Sūnzǐ's Art of War and Selections of Refined Literature. 

The Korean scholars were very proficient in literary Chinese. Well-known examples of Chinese-language literature in Korea include Three Kingdoms History, Memorabilia of the Three Kingdoms , New Stories of the Golden Turtle, The Cloud Dream of the Nine, Musical Canon, The Story of Hong Gildong and Licking One's Lips at the Butcher's Door.

Adaptation of hanja to Korean

The Chinese language, however, was quite different from the Korean language, consisting of terse, often monosyllabic words with a strictly analytic, SVO structure in stark contrast to the generally polysyllabic, very synthetic, SOV structure, with various grammatical endings that encoded person, levels of politeness and case.  Despite the adoption of literary Chinese as the written language, Chinese never replaced Korean as the spoken language, even amongst the scholars that had immersed themselves into its study. 

The first attempts to make literary Chinese texts more accessible to Korean readers were  passages written in Korean word order.  This would later develop into the gugyeol or 'separated phrases,' system.  Chinese texts were broken into meaningful blocks, and in the spaces were inserted hanja used to represent the sound of native Korean grammatical endings.  As literary Chinese was very terse, leaving much to be understood from context, insertion of occasional verbs and grammatical markers helped to clarify the meaning.  For instance, the hanja '' was used for its native Korean gloss whereas '' was used for its Sino-Korean pronunciation, and combined into '' and read , 'to do (and so).'  Special symbols were sometimes used to aid in the reordering of words in approximation of Korean grammar.  It was similar to the kanbun system developed in Japan to render Chinese texts.  The system was not a translation of Chinese into Korean, but an attempt to make Korean speakers knowledgeable in hanja overcome the difficulties in interpreting Chinese texts.  Although it was developed by scholars of the early Goryeo Kingdom (918–1392),  was of particular importance during the Joseon period, extending into the first decade of the twentieth century, since all civil servants were required to be able to read, translate and interpret Confucian texts and commentaries. 

The first attempt at transcribing Korean in hanja was the idu, or 'official reading,' system that began to appear after 500 AD. In this system, the hanja were chosen for their equivalent native Korean gloss. The various  conventions were developed in the Goryeo period but were particularly associated with the jung-in, the upper middle class of the early Joseon period.       

In mixed script, this would be rendered as '.' The  and its  variant were similar to the Japanese man'yogana system that would develop much later in Japan.   and its  variant were mostly replaced by mixed-script writing with hangul although  was not officially discontinued until 1894 when reforms abolished its usage in administrative records of civil servants.

Decline of Hanja 
The foremost problem at the centre of this debate is the use of Hanja. Mixed script could be commonly found in non-fiction writing, news papers, etc. until the enacting of Park Chung-hee's 5 Year Plan for Hangŭl Exclusivity  in 1968 banned the use and teaching of Hanja in public schools, as well as forbade its use in the military, with the goal of eliminating Hanja in writing by 1972 through legislative and executive means. However, due to public backlash, in 1972 Park's government allowed for the teaching of Hanja in special classes but maintained a ban on Hanja use in textbooks and other learning materials outside of the classes. This reverse step however, was optional so the availability of Hanja education was dependent on the school one went to. Park's Hanja ban was not formally lifted until 1992 under the government of Kim Young-Sam. In 1999 the government of Kim Dae-Jung actively promoted Hanja by placing it on signs on the road, at bus stops, and in subways. In 1999 Han Mun was reintroduced as a school elective and in 2001 the Hanja Proficiency Test  was introduced. In 2005 an older law, the Law Concerning Hangul Exclusivity  was repealed as well. In 2013 all elementary schools in Seoul started teaching Hanja. However, the result is that Koreans who were educated in this period having never been formally educated in Hanja are unable to use them and thus the use of Hanja has plummeted in orthography until the modern day. Where Hanja is now very rarely used and is almost only used for abbreviations in newspaper headlines (e.g.  for China,  for Korea,  for the United States,  for Japan, etc.), for clarification in text where a word might be confused for another due to homophones (e.g. vs.), or for stylistic use such as the  used on Shin Ramyŏn packaging.

A major motivation for the introduction of Chinese characters into Korea was the spread of Buddhism. The major Chinese text that introduced Hanja to Koreans, however, was not a religious text but the Chinese text Cheonjamun (Thousand Character Classic).

Although Koreans had to learn Classical Chinese to be properly literate for the most part, some additional systems were developed which used simplified forms of Chinese characters that phonetically transcribe Korean, including hyangchal, gugyeol, and idu.

One way of adapting Hanja to write Korean in such systems (such as Gugyeol) was to represent native Korean grammatical particles and other words solely according to their pronunciation. For example, Gugyeol uses the characters  to transcribe the Korean word , which in modern Korean means 'does, and so'. In Chinese, however, the same characters are read in Mandarin as the expression , meaning 'becoming a nun'. This is a typical example of Gugyeol words where the radical is read in Korean for its meaning (—'to do'), whereas the suffix ,  (meaning 'nun'), is used phonetically.

Hanja were the sole means of writing Korean until King Sejong the Great invented and promoted Hangul in the 15th century.

Hangul effectively replaced Hanja in official and scholarly writing only in the 20th century. Since June 1949, Hanja have not officially been used in North Korea, and, in addition, most texts are now most commonly written horizontally instead of vertically. Many words borrowed from Chinese have also been replaced in the North with native Korean words. Nevertheless, a large number of Chinese-borrowed words are still widely used in the North (although written in Hangul), and Hanja still appear in special contexts, such as recent North Korean dictionaries. The replacement has been less total in South Korea where, although usage has declined over time, some Hanja remain in common usage in some contexts.

Character formation
Each Hanja is composed of one of 214 radicals plus in most cases one or more additional elements. The vast majority of Hanja use the additional elements to indicate the sound of the character, but a few Hanja are purely pictographic, and some were formed in other ways.

The historical use of Hanja in Korea has had a change over time. Hanja became prominent in use by the elite class between the 3rd and 4th centuries by the Three Kingdoms. The use came from Chinese that migrated into Korea. With them they brought the writing system Hanja. Thus the hanja being used came from the characters already being used by the Chinese at the time. 

Since Hanja was primarily used by the elite and scholars, it was hard for others to learn, thus much character development was limited. Scholars in the 4th century used this to study and write Confucian classics. Character formation is also coined to the  form which was a Buddhist writing system for Chinese characters. This practice however was limited due to the opinion of Buddhism whether it was favorable at the time or not.

Eumhun
To aid in understanding the meaning of a character, or to describe it orally to distinguish it from other characters with the same pronunciation, character dictionaries and school textbooks refer to each character with a combination of its sound and a word indicating its meaning. This dual meaning-sound reading of a character is called  (from  'sound' +  'meaning,' 'teaching').

The word or words used to denote the meaning are often—though hardly always—words of native Korean (i.e., non-Chinese) origin, and are sometimes archaic words no longer commonly used.

Education

South
South Korean primary schools ceased the teaching of Hanja in elementary schools in the 1970s, although they are still taught as part of the mandatory curriculum in grade 6. They are taught in separate courses in South Korean high schools, separately from the normal Korean-language curriculum. Formal Hanja education begins in grade 7 (junior high school) and continues until graduation from senior high school in grade 12. 

A total of 1,800 Hanja are taught: 900 for junior high, and 900 for senior high (starting in grade 10). Post-secondary Hanja education continues in some liberal-arts universities. The 1972 promulgation of basic Hanja for educational purposes changed on December 31, 2000, to replace 44 Hanja with 44 others.

South Korea's Ministry of Education generally encourages all primary schools to offer Hanja classes. Officials said that learning Chinese characters could enhance students' Korean-language proficiency. Initially announced as a mandatory requirement, it is now considered optional.

North
Though North Korea rapidly abandoned the general use of Hanja soon after independence, the number of Hanja taught in primary and secondary schools is actually greater than the 1,800 taught in South Korea. Kim Il-sung had earlier called for a gradual elimination of the use of Hanja, but by the 1960s, he had reversed his stance; he was quoted as saying in 1966, "While we should use as few Sinitic terms as possible, students must be exposed to the necessary Chinese characters and taught how to write them." 

As a result, a Chinese-character textbook was designed for North Korean schools for use in grades 5–9, teaching 1,500 characters, with another 500 for high school students. College students are exposed to another 1,000, bringing the total to 3,000.

Uses
Because many different Hanja—and thus, many different words written using Hanja—often share the same sounds, two distinct Hanja words may be spelled identically in the phonetic Hangul alphabet. Hanja's language of origin, Chinese, has many homophones, and Hanja words became even more homophonic when they came into Korean, since Korean lacks a tonal system, which is how Chinese distinguishes many words that would otherwise be homophonic. For this reason, Hanja are often used to clarify meaning, either on their own without the equivalent Hangul spelling or in parentheses after the Hangul spelling as a kind of gloss. Hanja are often also used as a form of shorthand in newspaper headlines, advertisements, and on signs, for example the banner at the funeral for the sailors lost in the sinking of ROKS Cheonan (PCC-772).

Print media

In South Korea, Hanja are used most frequently in ancient literature, legal documents, and scholarly monographs, where they often appear without the equivalent Hangul spelling. Usually, only those words with a specialized or ambiguous meaning are printed in Hanja. In mass-circulation books and magazines, Hanja are generally used rarely, and only to gloss words already spelled in Hangul when the meaning is ambiguous. Hanja are also often used in newspaper headlines as abbreviations or to eliminate ambiguity. 

In formal publications, personal names are also usually glossed in Hanja in parentheses next to the Hangul. Aside from academic usage, Hanja are often used for advertising or decorative purposes in South Korea, and appear frequently in athletic events and cultural parades, packaging and labeling, dictionaries and atlases. In contrast, North Korea eliminated the use of Hanja even in academic publications by 1949 on the orders of Kim Il-sung, a situation that has since remained unchanged.

Dictionaries
In modern Korean dictionaries, all entry words of Sino-Korean origin are printed in Hangul and listed in Hangul order, with the Hanja given in parentheses immediately following the entry word.

This practice helps to eliminate ambiguity, and it also serves as a sort of shorthand etymology, since the meaning of the Hanja and the fact that the word is composed of Hanja often help to illustrate the word's origin.

As an example of how Hanja can help to clear up ambiguity, many homophones can be distinguished by using hanja. An example is the word , which may have meanings such as:

 : spiritual discipline
 : prisoner
 : 'city of water' (e.g. Venice or Suzhou)
 : paddy rice
 : drain, rivers, path of surface water
 : tunnel
 : capital (city)
 : hand knife

Hanja dictionaries for specialist usage –  or  – are organized by radical (the traditional Chinese method of classifying characters).

Personal names
Korean personal names, including all Korean surnames and most Korean given names, are based on Hanja and are generally written in it, although some exceptions exist. On business cards, the use of Hanja is slowly fading away, with most older people displaying their names exclusively in Hanja while most of the younger generation using both Hangul and Hanja. Korean personal names usually consist of a one-character family name followed by a two-character given name. There are a few two-character family names (e.g. , Namgung), and the holders of such names—but not only them—tend to have one-syllable given names. Traditionally, the given name in turn consists of one character unique to the individual and one character shared by all people in a family of the same sex and generation (see Generation name).

During the Japanese administration of Korea (1910–1945), Koreans were forced to adopt Japanese-style names, including polysyllabic readings of the Hanja, but this practice was reversed by post-independence governments in Korea. Since the 1970s, some parents have given their children given names that are simply native Korean words. Popular ones include Haneul—meaning 'sky'—and Iseul—meaning 'morning dew'. Nevertheless, on official documents, people's names are still recorded in both Hangul and in Hanja.

Toponymy
Due to standardization efforts during Goryeo and Joseon eras, native Korean placenames were converted to Hanja, and most names used today are Hanja-based. The most notable exception is the name of the capital, Seoul, a native Korean word meaning 'capital' with no direct Hanja conversion; the Hanja  ('capital') is sometimes used as a back-rendering. For example, disyllabic names of railway lines, freeways, and provinces are often formed by taking one character from each of the two locales' names; thus,
 The Gyeongbu corridor connects Seoul and Busan;
 The Gyeongin corridor connects Seoul and Incheon;
 The former Jeolla Province took its name from the first characters in the city names Jeonju and Naju (Naju is originally Raju, but the initial "r/l" sound in South Korean is simplified to "n").

Most atlases of Korea today are published in two versions: one in Hangul (sometimes with some English as well), and one in Hanja. Subway and railway station signs give the station's name in Hangul, Hanja, and English, both to assist visitors (including Chinese or Japanese who may rely on the Hanja spellings) and to disambiguate the name.

Academia

Hanja are still required for certain disciplines in academia, such as Oriental Studies and other disciplines studying Chinese, Japanese or historic Korean literature and culture, since the vast majority of primary source text material are written in Hanzi, Kanji or Hanja.

Art and culture
For the traditional creative arts such as calligraphy and painting, a knowledge of Hanja is needed to write and understand the various scripts and inscriptions, as is the same in China and Japan. Many old songs and poems are written and based on Hanja characters.

On 9 September 2003, the celebration for the 55th anniversary of North Korea featured a float welcoming Kim Il-Sung, including a banner with Kim Il-Sung's name written in Hanja.

Popular usage

Opinion surveys in South Korea regarding the issue of Hanja use have had mixed responses in the past. Hanja terms are also expressed through Hangul, the standard script in the Korean language. Hanja use within general Korean literature has declined since the 1980s because formal Hanja education in South Korea does not begin until the seventh year of schooling, due to changes in government policy during the time. 

In 1956, one study found mixed-script Korean text (in which Sino-Korean nouns are written using Hanja, and other words using Hangul) were read faster than texts written purely in Hangul; however, by 1977, the situation had reversed. In 1988, 65% of one sample of people without a college education "evinced no reading comprehension of any but the most common hanja" when reading mixed-script passages.

Gukja 

A small number of characters were invented by the Koreans themselves. These characters are called  (literally 'national characters'). Most of them are for proper names (place-names and people's names) but some refer to Korean-specific concepts and materials.

See Korean gukja characters at Wiktionary for more examples.

Yakja 

Some Hanja characters have simplified forms that can be seen in casual use.

Pronunciation
Each Hanja character is pronounced as a single syllable, corresponding to a single composite character in Hangul. The pronunciation of Hanja in Korean is by no means identical to the way they are pronounced in modern Chinese, particularly Mandarin, although some Chinese dialects and Korean share similar pronunciations for some characters.

One difference is the loss of tone from standard Korean while most Chinese dialects retain tone.

Due to divergence in pronunciation since the time of borrowing, sometimes the pronunciation of a Hanja and its corresponding hanzi may differ considerably. However, in most modern Korean dialects (especially South Korean ones),  is pronounced as  when used in an initial position, due to a systematic elision of initial n when followed by y or i.

There are some pronunciation correspondence between the onset, rhyme, and coda between Cantonese and Korean.

When learning how to write Hanja, students are taught to memorize the native Korean pronunciation for the Hanja's meaning and the Sino-Korean pronunciations (the pronunciation based on the Chinese pronunciation of the characters) for each Hanja respectively so that students know what the syllable and meaning is for a particular Hanja. The naming of Hanja is similar to if water, horse and gold were named "water-aqua", "horse-equus", or "gold-aurum" based on a hybridization of both the English and the Latin names.

See also 
 Chinese characters
 Chinese influence on Korean culture
 Chinese-language literature of Korea
 East Asian cultural sphere
 Kanji – Japanese equivalent of Chinese characters 
 McCune–Reischauer
 New Korean Orthography
 Revised Romanization of Korean
 Yale romanization of Korean

References

Citations

Sources 

 
 
 
 
 
 

Chinese characters
East Asian culture
East Asia
Southeast Asia
Korean language
Korean writing system
Logographic writing systems
Writing systems without word boundaries